The 1993–94 NBA season was the 24th season of the National Basketball Association franchise based in Cleveland, Ohio. During the off-season, the Cavaliers acquired Tyrone Hill from the Golden State Warriors, and signed free agent Rod Higgins in December. Under new head coach Mike Fratello, the Cavaliers struggled playing below .500 with a 7–14 start, but soon recovered and held a 24–23 record at the All-Star break. The Cavs were bitten by the injury bug again as Brad Daugherty missed 32 games with a back injury, while Larry Nance missed 49 games with a knee injury, and Hill missed 25 games due to thumb and knee injuries. However, Mark Price, Hot Rod Williams and Gerald Wilkins would all step up, as the Cavaliers posted an 11-game winning streak between February and March, finishing 4th in the Central Division with a 47–35 record.

Price led the team with 17.3 points, 7.8 assists and 1.4 steals per game, and was named to the All-NBA Third Team, and selected for the 1994 NBA All-Star Game, while Williams averaged 13.7 points, 7.6 rebounds and 1.7 blocks per game, and Wilkins provided the team with 14.3 points per game. In addition, Daugherty averaged 17.0 points and 10.2 rebounds per game, while Nance provided with 11.2 points, 6.9 rebounds and 1.7 blocks per game, and Hill contributed 10.6 points and 8.8 rebounds per game. First round draft pick Chris Mills averaged 9.4 points and 5.1 rebounds per game off the bench, while Bobby Phills stepped into the lineup and contributed 8.3 points per game, and Terrell Brandon provided with 8.3 points and 3.8 assists per game off the bench.

However, during the final month of the regular season, Williams went down with a broken right thumb. With the lack of big men on the team during the playoffs, the Cavaliers were swept by the Chicago Bulls in three straight games in the Eastern Conference First Round.

This was also the Cavaliers final season playing at The Coliseum in Richfield, Ohio. Following the season, Nance retired, and Higgins was released to free agency. This was also Daugherty's final season of his career, as he missed all of the next two seasons due to back injuries.

Offseason

Free Agents

Trades

Draft picks

Roster

Regular season

Season standings

y - clinched division title
x - clinched playoff spot

z - clinched division title
y - clinched division title
x - clinched playoff spot

Record vs. opponents

Game log

|-style="background:#fcc;"
| 1 || November 5, 1993 || Milwaukee
|-style="background:#fcc;"
| 2 || November 7, 1993 || New York
|-style="background:#cfc;"
| 3 || November 9, 1993 || Charlotte
|-style="background:#fcc;"
| 4 || November 11, 1993 || @ Seattle
|-style="background:#cfc;"
| 5 || November 12, 1993 || @ Golden State
|-style="background:#fcc;"
| 6 || November 14, 1993 || @ L.A. Lakers
|-style="background:#cfc;"
| 7 || November 16, 1993 || @ Portland
|-style="background:#fcc;"
| 8 || November 18, 1993 || @ Denver
|-style="background:#fcc;"
| 9 || November 20, 1993 || @ Phoenix
|-style="background:#cfc;"
| 10 || November 24, 1993 || Washington
|-style="background:#cfc;"
| 11 || November 27, 1993 || Seattle
|-style="background:#cfc;"
| 12 || November 30, 1993 || Detroit

|-style="background:#fcc;"
| 13 || December 1, 1993 || @ New Jersey
|-style="background:#fcc;"
| 14 || December 4, 1993 || Orlando
|-style="background:#fcc;"
| 15 || December 5, 1993 || Houston
|-style="background:#cfc;"
| 16 || December 7, 1993 || Portland
|-style="background:#fcc;"
| 17 || December 9, 1993 || @ Charlotte
|-style="background:#fcc;"
| 18 || December 11, 1993 || @ Chicago
|-style="background:#fcc;"
| 19 || December 14, 19937:30 pm EST || Atlanta
| L 92–103
| Williams (18)
| Daugherty (14)
| Brandon (7)
| Richfield Coliseum17,022
| 7–12
|-style="background:#fcc;"
| 20 || December 16, 1993 || @ Miami
|-style="background:#fcc;"
| 21 || December 18, 1993 || @ Detroit
|-style="background:#cfc;"
| 22 || December 19, 1993 || L.A. Lakers
|-style="background:#cfc;"
| 23 || December 21, 1993 || Utah
|-style="background:#cfc;"
| 24 || December 23, 1993 || Milwaukee
|-style="background:#cfc;"
| 25 || December 26, 1993 || Indiana
|-style="background:#cfc;"
| 26 || December 28, 1993 || Charlotte
|-style="background:#fcc;"
| 27 || December 30, 1993 || @ Milwaukee

|-style="background:#fcc;"
| 28 || January 4, 1994 || @ Indiana
|-style="background:#fcc;"
| 29 || January 5, 1994 || Boston
|-style="background:#cfc;"
| 30 || January 7, 1994 || @ Boston
|-style="background:#fcc;"
| 31 || January 8, 19947:30 pm EST || @ Atlanta
| L 89–102
| Wilkins (19)
| Daugherty,Nance (10)
| Price (9)
| The Omni16,368
| 13–18
|-style="background:#cfc;"
| 32 || January 12, 1994 || @ Orlando
|-style="background:#cfc;"
| 33 || January 13, 1994 || New Jersey
|-style="background:#cfc;"
| 34 || January 15, 1994 || Philadelphia
|-style="background:#cfc;"
| 35 || January 17, 1994 || Orlando
|-style="background:#fcc;"
| 36 || January 19, 1994 || @ Utah
|-style="background:#cfc;"
| 37 || January 21, 1994 || @ L.A. Clippers
|-style="background:#cfc;"
| 38 || January 22, 1994 || @ Sacramento
|-style="background:#fcc;"
| 39 || January 25, 1994 || @ Houston
|-style="background:#cfc;"
| 40 || January 27, 1994 || Chicago
|-style="background:#fcc;"
| 41 || January 29, 1994 || Miami
|-style="background:#cfc;"
| 42 || January 31, 1994 || @ Detroit

|-style="background:#cfc;"
| 43 || February 2, 1994 || @ Philadelphia
|-style="background:#fcc;"
| 44 || February 3, 1994 || San Antonio
|-style="background:#cfc;"
| 45 || February 5, 19947:30 pm EST || Atlanta
| W 109–93
| Williams (19)
| Nance (13)
| Price (13)
| Richfield Coliseum20,273
| 23–22
|-style="background:#cfc;"
| 46 || February 8, 1994 || New Jersey
|-style="background:#fcc;"
| 47 || February 9, 1994 || @ New Jersey
|-style="background:#cfc;"
| 48 || February 15, 1994 || Denver
|-style="background:#fcc;"
| 49 || February 17, 1994 || New York
|-style="background:#cfc;"
| 50 || February 18, 1994 || @ Minnesota
|-style="background:#cfc;"
| 51 || February 20, 1994 || @ Charlotte
|-style="background:#cfc;"
| 52 || February 22, 1994 || Minnesota
|-style="background:#cfc;"
| 53 || February 23, 1994 || @ Washington
|-style="background:#cfc;"
| 54 || February 25, 1994 || Golden State
|-style="background:#cfc;"
| 55 || February 26, 1994 || Dallas
|-style="background:#cfc;"
| 56 || February 28, 1994 || @ Chicago

|-style="background:#cfc;"
| 57 || March 2, 1994 || @ Boston
|-style="background:#cfc;"
| 58 || March 3, 1994 || Philadelphia
|-style="background:#cfc;"
| 59 || March 6, 1994 || Chicago
|-style="background:#cfc;"
| 60 || March 8, 1994 || Sacramento
|-style="background:#fcc;"
| 61 || March 11, 1994 || @ Detroit
|-style="background:#fcc;"
| 62 || March 12, 1994 || @ New York
|-style="background:#fcc;"
| 63 || March 15, 1994 || Phoenix
|-style="background:#fcc;"
| 64 || March 18, 1994 || @ Orlando
|-style="background:#fcc;"
| 65 || March 19, 1994 || @ Miami
|-style="background:#cfc;"
| 66 || March 22, 1994 || Indiana
|-style="background:#fcc;"
| 67 || March 23, 1994 || @ Indiana
|-style="background:#cfc;"
| 68 || March 25, 1994 || @ Philadelphia
|-style="background:#cfc;"
| 69 || March 27, 1994 || Detroit
|-style="background:#cfc;"
| 70 || March 29, 1994 || L.A. Clippers
|-style="background:#fcc;"
| 71 || March 31, 1994 || @ San Antonio

|-style="background:#cfc;"
| 72 || April 2, 1994 || @ Dallas
|-style="background:#cfc;"
| 73 || April 5, 1994 || Charlotte
|-style="background:#fcc;"
| 74 || April 7, 1994 || @ New York
|-style="background:#fcc;"
| 75 || April 8, 1994 || @ Washington
|-style="background:#cfc;"
| 76 || April 12, 1994 || Milwaukee
|-style="background:#fcc;"
| 77 || April 13, 19947:30 pm EDT || @ Atlanta
| L 95–110
| Brandon (16)
| Phills (8)
| Brandon (5)
| The Omni13,675
| 43–34
|-style="background:#cfc;"
| 78 || April 15, 1994 || Miami
|-style="background:#cfc;"
| 79 || April 16, 1994 || @ Milwaukee
|-style="background:#fcc;"
| 80 || April 20, 1994 || @ Indiana
|-style="background:#cfc;"
| 81 || April 22, 1994 || Washington
|-style="background:#cfc;"
| 82 || April 24, 1994 || Boston

Playoffs

|- align="center" bgcolor="#ffcccc"
| 1
| April 29
| @ Chicago
| L 96–104
| Gerald Wilkins (23)
| Tyrone Hill (8)
| Mark Price (5)
| Chicago Stadium18,676
| 0–1
|- align="center" bgcolor="#ffcccc"
| 2
| May 1
| @ Chicago
| L 96–105
| Gerald Wilkins (28)
| Tyrone Hill (10)
| Price, Phills (4)
| Chicago Stadium18,676
| 0–2
|- align="center" bgcolor="#ffcccc"
| 3
| May 3
| Chicago
| L 92–95 (OT)
| Chris Mills (25)
| Tyrone Hill (13)
| Gerald Wilkins (7)
| Richfield Coliseum17,778
| 0–3
|-

Player stats

Regular season

Playoffs

Player Statistics Citation:

Awards and records

Awards

Records

Milestones

All-Star

Transactions

Trades

Free Agents

Development League

References

 Cleveland Cavaliers on Database Basketball
 Cleveland Cavaliers on Basketball Reference

Cleveland Cavaliers seasons
Cleve
Cleve